Botnedalen is a valley in Tokke Municipality in Vestfold og Telemark county, Norway. The valley used to be the site a number of mountain farms that are no longer in use. The river that runs through the valley was dammed, creating the lake Botnedalsvatn. The lake is as a reservoir for the nearby Byrte Hydroelectric Power Station. Botnedalen is known for the occurrence of various minerals, including hausmannite, jacobsite, braunite, bustamite and rhodonite.

References

Further reading

Valleys of Vestfold og Telemark
Tokke